Callisema elongata is a species of beetle in the family Cerambycidae. It was described by Galileo and Martins in 1992. It is known from Colombia and Venezuela.

References

Calliini
Beetles described in 1992